Schøyen is a surname. Notable people with the surname include:

Carl Schøyen (1877-1951) Norwegian author
Erna Schøyen (1887-1968) Norwegian actress
Hege Schøyen (born 1957), Norwegian singer, actor, and comedian
Martin Schøyen (born 1940), Norwegian businessman, historian, and book collector
Per G. Schøyen (1924–2017), Norwegian diplomat
Rolf Schøyen (born 1936) Norwegian physician and medical microbiologist
Thor Hiorth Schøyen (1885-1961) First curator of the Oslo Zoological Museum in 1908
Wilhelm Maribo Schøyen (1844-1918) Norwegian entomologist